Kastav Film Festival is an international film festival founded in 2009. Since then, the festival is held every June in Kastav, Croatia.

The festival shows all of the submitted films and has no jury.

Manifest 
To read about KFF manifest follow this link

See also 
List of film festivals in Europe

References

External links 
 
Facebook

Film festivals in Croatia
Recurring events established in 2009
2009 establishments in Croatia
Tourist attractions in Istria County
Spring (season) events in Croatia